Arthur Geoffrey Dyke Acland (17 May 1908 – 14 September 1964), known as Geoffrey Acland, was a British Liberal Party politician.

Born near Hanover Square in London to Liberal Party MP Francis Dyke Acland and Eleanor Margaret Cropper, Geoffrey was the younger brother of Richard Acland, who later became a Common Wealth Party and Labour Party MP.  He studied at Rugby School, Trinity College, Cambridge, and the University of Grenoble.  During the Second World War, he served with the Border Regiment, rising to become a Captain.

After the war, Acland became joint managing director of some paper mills, and he stood unsuccessfully for the Liberal Party in Westmorland at each election from 1945 to 1959.  From 1954 to 1956, he was the Chairman of the Liberal Party. Acland married Winifred Julian Dorothy Fothergill in 1932, and they were the parents of six children.

References

1908 births
1964 deaths
Military personnel from London
Geoffrey
Alumni of Trinity College, Cambridge
British Army personnel of World War II
Chairs of the Liberal Party (UK)
People educated at Rugby School
Grenoble Alpes University alumni
Border Regiment officers
Liberal Party (UK) parliamentary candidates
Younger sons of baronets